Make a Scene is the fourth studio album by English singer and songwriter Sophie Ellis-Bextor, released in Russia on 18 April 2011 by Universal Music Group and in the United Kingdom on 13 June 2011 by Ellis-Bextor's own record label, EBGB's. It is her first studio album since Trip the Light Fantastic (2007).

Background
Make a Scene originated from recording sessions for a planned Greatest Hits compilation, which was proposed for release in Autumn 2008. However, the success of recording sessions led Ellis-Bextor and her record label at the time, Fascination Records, to change their plans and record a full studio album instead. The album's lead single, "Heartbreak (Make Me a Dancer)", a collaboration with the Freemasons, was released in June 2009, before a second single, "Can't Fight This Feeling", a collaboration with Junior Caldera, was released in February 2010. The album's third single, "Bittersweet", was released in May 2010, and was the first single from the album to feature only Ellis-Bextor. The album's fourth single, "Not Giving Up on Love", a collaboration with Armin van Buuren, was released in August 2010. Following the release of these four singles, Ellis-Bextor parted ways with Fascination, leaving the future of the album hanging in the balance. However, Ellis-Bextor soon announced plans to release the album on her own label, EBGBs, which she had set up in 2002 with her father, Robin Bextor.

The album's title, Make a Scene, was announced in January 2011, despite rumours the album would be named Cut Straight to the Heart, after the final track on the album. This was rather unexpected as Ellis-Bextor had previously criticised title tracks. On 11 April 2011, "Off & On" was released as the album's fifth single overall, exclusively in Russia, before the album was released a week later on 18 April. On 5 June, "Starlight" was released as the album's sixth single overall, exclusively in the United Kingdom, before the album was released a week later on 12 June. In 2012 "Revolution" was released as the album's seventh and final single overall but, unlike the majority of the singles, it was an international release.

Composition
Make a Scene features production by Fred Ball, Armin van Buuren, Junior Caldera, Julien Carret, Freemasons, Ed Harcourt, Calvin Harris, Greg Kurstin, Liam Howe, Metronomy, Richard Stannard, Dimitri Tikovoi, and Richard X. According to Clixie Music, on the opening track "Revolution", Ellis-Bextor has been said to utilise catchy repetition and deliver a sweet vocal with "commanding vocals". It was described as "a heavily energetic and impressive opener that defines the overall mood." Following the opener is the third single "Bittersweet" and the electropop "Off & On", which Clixie elaborated on as having an early 1980s disco sound. It was written by Calvin Harris and Irish singer Róisín Murphy and was originally recorded with Murphy on vocals for Murphy's 2007 studio album Overpowered, but was omitted from the final track listing. Both "Not Giving Up on Love" and "Can't Fight This Feeling" have been called anthems by Clixie Music, as well as "international smash singles". "Starlight" was also said to feature a "soothing" vocal delivery by Ellis-Bextor, with a "very '80s-esque twist." "Magic" is a dance music-driven track and was called "enjoyable" due to its employment of harmonic vocals. Finally, "Synchronised" and "Cut Straight to the Heart" were talked about as focussing on Sophie's vocals, and noted as being "a lot more relaxed" in comparison to the rest of the album.

Critical reception

Make a Scene received mixed reviews from music critics. At Metacritic, which assigns a rating out of 100 to reviews from mainstream critics, the album received an average score of 53, based on 7 reviews. While reviewing some songs on the album, Robbie Daw from Idolator said that "after taking in small handful of singles, it sounds like there's even better material lying in wait on Make A Scene". Daw called the Richard X productions "Starlight" and "Magic" are "amazing". Lee Bradshaw from Clixie Music rated it eight stars out of ten, labeling it "her most dance-filled release" and praised Sophie for having "out-done herself on this one", stating that "she has definitely provided an album with great future potential." Robert Copsey from Digital Spy was positive, rating it four stars out of five, opining that the "wistful pop-ballads 'Starlight' and 'Synchronised' proving that she is more than capable of handling the centre stage if she so chooses. It might be a scene of two halves, but there's no shortage of elegance, class and pop sensibilities throughout."

Caroline Sullivan from The Guardian rated it two stars out of five and concluded that "The bulk of the record is shopping-mall pop that was probably expensive to make, but sounds depressingly cheap." Matt Wilkinson from NME was negative, rating it two stars out of ten, commenting that "Make A Scene sees her straddle a multitude of different genres" Gavin Martin from The Mirror was positive, feeling that the album is a "jolly effective blend of high-bred hoofing, fun and sincerity." James Lachno from The Daily Telegraph judged that "A legion of co-producers attempt to recreate the slick dance-pop for which she is famed, but too often her husky voice and arch delivery are given short shrift by bloated house beats and perfunctory hooks." Alex Hall from The Tune was positive, saying that "Make A Scene is by no means a 'dark' record; however, Sophie Ellis-Bextor manages to prevent what would have been an unbearable 50 minutes had every song been a reproduction of 'Starlight' by applying to the crevasses all the insight she's gained in a decade." Gay Times also gave a positive review, calling it "a proper pop album...easily head and shoulders above the offerings from her contemporaries in the last year".

Commercial performance
Make a Scene entered the UK Albums Chart at number thirty-three with first-week sales of 6,143 copies, and by January 2014, it had sold 13,716 copies in the United Kingdom. Within three months of release, the album received a gold certification in Russia, denoting sales in excess of 5,000 copies. In spite of the album's lack of success, its singles became top 30 hits in the UK and Europe.

Track listing

Personnel
Credits adapted from the liner notes of Make a Scene.

 Sophie Ellis-Bextor – vocals
 Fred Ball – keyboards, production, programming 
 Andy Bradfield – mixing 
 Armin van Buuren – production 
 Junior Caldera – instruments, mixing, production 
 Julien Carret – mixing, production 
 Cathy Dennis – backing vocals, vocal production 
 Richard Edgeler – assistant mixing 
 Ben Epstein – guitar 
 Steve Fitzmaurice – mixing 
 Future Cut – production 
 Benno de Goeij – production 
 Ed Harcourt – piano, production, string arrangement, string conducting, synths 
 Calvin Harris – arrangement, instruments, production 
 Marianne Haynes – violin 
 Pete Hofmann – mixing 
 Louise Hogan – viola 
 Liam Howe – production ; mixing 
 Ash Howes – mixing ; additional engineering 
 Jordan Jay – A&R 
 Greg Kurstin – keyboards, production, programming ; engineering, guitar, mixing 
 George Lambert – mastering 
 Amy Langley – cello 
 Gita Langley – violin 

 Rosie Langley – violin 
 Mike Marsh – mastering
 Metronomy – production 
 Joseph Mount – producer 
 Miriam Nervo – backing vocals, vocal production 
 Olivia Nervo – backing vocals, vocal production 
 Emile Ogoo – bass guitar 
 Rob Orton – mixing 
 Richard X – production 
 Hannah Robinson – backing vocals 
 Russell Small – production ; keyboards, programming ; mixing, percussion 
 Amy Stanford – viola 
 Ellie Stanford – violin 
 Richard "Biff" Stannard – production ; keyboards, programming ; additional programming 
 Brio Taliaferro – additional programming 
 Dimitri Tikovoi – production 
 Jeremy Wheatley – mixing 
 Richard Wilkinson – engineering 
 Harriet Wiltshire – cello 
 James Wiltshire – keyboards, production, programming ; mixing 
 Jeremy Yeremian – mixing 
 Chris Young – vocal engineering

Charts

Weekly charts

Year-end charts

Certifications

Release history

References

2011 albums
Albums produced by Calvin Harris
Albums produced by Greg Kurstin
Albums produced by Richard X
Sophie Ellis-Bextor albums
Albums produced by Dimitri Tikovoi
Nu-disco albums
Synth-pop albums by English artists
Albums produced by Richard Stannard (songwriter)